The Billion Dollar Hobo is a 1977 American comedy film starring Tim Conway and Will Geer (in his last role).

Plot
Conway is Vernon Praiseworthy, only heir to his uncle's fortune, who faced poverty and misfortune during the Great Depression but managed to build up his riches despite these hardships. To become eligible for the inheritance, Vernon must suffer as his uncle did by becoming a migrant hobo for a time. Soon after, Vernon and the dog sent to protect him are caught up in a dognapping scheme.

Cast
 Tim Conway as Vernon Praiseworthy
 Will Geer as Choo Choo Trayne
 Eric Weston as Steve
 Sydney Lassick as Mitchell
 John Myhers as Leonard Cox
 Frank Sivero as Ernie
 Sharon Clark as Jen
 Victoria Carroll as Barbara Henderson
 Sheela Tessler as Rita
 Mickey Morton as Kotch
 Roger Barkley as Guard#2
 Al Lohman as Guard#1 (as Al Loehman)
 Kaye Elhardt as Miss Evans
 London the Wonder Dog as Bo

Production notes
 Jimmie Rodgers sang the song in the film entitled "Half Sung Song".
 London the Wonder Dog would later star in the TV series The Littlest Hobo.

External links 
 
 
 
 

1977 comedy films
1977 films
American comedy films
Fictional hoboes
1970s English-language films
1970s American films